Summit is a city in Union County, in the U.S. state of New Jersey. The city is located on a ridge in northern-central New Jersey, within the Raritan Valley and Rahway Valley regions in the New York metropolitan area. As of the 2020 United States census, the city's population was 22,719, an increase of 1,262 (+5.9%) from the 2010 census count of 21,457, which in turn reflected an increase of 326 (+1.5%) from the 21,131 counted in the 2000 census.

Originally incorporated as Summit Township by an act of the New Jersey Legislature on March 23, 1869, from portions of New Providence Township (now Berkeley Heights) and Springfield Township, Summit was reincorporated as a city on March 8, 1899.

Possible derivations of Summit's name include its location atop the Second Watchung Mountain; the Summit Lodge, the house to which jurist James Kent moved in 1837 and which stands today at 50 Kent Place Boulevard; and to a local sawmill owner who granted passage to the Morris and Essex Railroad for a route to "the summit of the Short Hills".

Summit had the 16th-highest per capita income in the state as of the 2000 Census. According to Bloomberg, Summit ranked as the 70th highest-income place in the United States in 2017, 72nd in 2018 (with an average household income of $220,971), and 65th in 2019.

History

18th century
The region in which Summit is located was purchased from Native Americans on October 28, 1664. Summit's earliest European settlers came to the area around the year 1710. The original name of Summit was "Turkey Hill" to distinguish it from the area then known as "Turkey" (New Providence's original name until 1759). During the American Revolutionary War, Summit was known as "Beacon Hill", because bonfire beacons were lit on an eastern ridge in Summit to warn the New Jersey militiamen of approaching British troops.

Summit was called the "Heights over Springfield" during the late 18th century and most of the 19th century, and was considered a part of New Providence. During this period, Summit was part of Springfield Township, which eventually broke up into separate municipalities. Eventually, only Summit and New Providence remained joined.

19th century
Lord Chancellor James Kent, a Chancellor of New York State and author of Commentaries on American Law, retired to this area in 1837 in a house he called Summit Lodge (perhaps a namesake of the town) on what is now called Kent Place Boulevard. He lived there until 1847. Today, the lodge is part of a large mansion, at 50 Kent Place Boulevard, opposite Kent Place School.

In 1837, the Morris and Essex Railroad, which became the Delaware Lackawanna and Western Railroad and is now NJ Transit's Morris and Essex Lines, was built over what was then called "The Summit" hill, a name later shortened to Summit. The railroad allowed Summit to outgrow neighboring New Providence, which didn't have a train station. In 1868, a hotel named "The Summit House" burned beside the railroad. In 1869, Summit and New Providence separated and the Summit area was incorporated as the "Township of Summit". In the late 19th century, the area began shifting from farmland to wealthy estates; in 1892, renowned architect C. Abbott French cleared away a crest of a "summit ridge", removing "an impenetrable tangle of wild vines ... and myriads of rattlesnakes," to build a house with a view of New York City, The Times Building, and the Brooklyn Bridge. The present-day incarnation of Summit, known formally as the City of Summit, was incorporated on April 11, 1899.

During this time, Summit was the home of America's "antivice crusader", Anthony Comstock, who moved there about 1880 and built a house in 1892 at 35 Beekman Road, where he died in 1915.

In the 19th century, Summit served as a nearby getaway spot for wealthy residents of New York City in search of fresh air. Weekenders or summer vacationers would reach Summit by train and relax at large hotels and smaller inns and guest houses. Calvary Episcopal Church was built in 1894–1895; the New York Times called it a "handsome new house of worship".

20th century
Silk weaving, which had thrived as an industry in the late 19th century, declined in the early decades of the 20th. In 1915, there was a strike at the Summit Silk Company on Weaver Street. In the early 20th century, there was much building; in 1909, one report suggested at least 40 residences were being built (some with stables) with costs varying from $4,500 to $45,000, making it "one of the greatest periods of building activity this place, the Hill City, has known."

A new railway was constructed from what was then-called New Orange. The Rahway Valley Railroad connected Summit with the Delaware, Lackawanna and Western Railroad (DL&W). In the early 20th century, both freight and passenger service were offered by this line. (Although in 2009, Union County was exploring the possibility of reactivating the long-dormant line for freight traffic.) A trolley line called the Morris County Traction Company, once ran a passenger trolley through Summit to/from Newark and Morris County, in the early part of the 20th century. Broad Street in Summit was designed and built for the trolley, which is why it is wider and straighter than most streets in the city. Portions of the rails could still be seen on it as late as the 1980s.

Relations between city authorities and businesses have not always been smooth; in 1898, city authorities and the New York and New Jersey Telephone Company had disputes about wires and telephone poles; the city acted and "wires and cables of the company were cut from the poles." There were disputes between Summit's commuters and the Lackawanna railroad about walkways; in one incident in 1905, "a number of passengers seeking to board the 6:35 train found their way barred. They made a united rush, and when the dust cleared away, the door wasn't there. It is said the company will put the door back. The commuters say they will remove it as often as it is replaced."

Following World War II, the city experienced a building boom as living outside New York City and commuting to work became more common and the population of New Jersey grew. At this point, Summit took on its suburban character of tree lined streets and architect-designed houses that it is known for today.

In 1974 there was a lawsuit to split "East Summit" off as its own municipality. Until 1973 the city had been divided into two wards, east and west, by the Erie-Lackawanna Railroad tracks. Right before the 1973 municipal election new ward districts where determined that overrode the preexisting geographic boundaries in order to make the two wards roughly equal in population. Following a sweeping Republican victory in the election, the citizens of the eastern portion of the city claimed they had been gerrymandered by the city's Republican leadership in mayor Elmer J. Bennett and council president Frank Lehr. The eastern half of the city was more ethnically diverse and with a predominately Democratic voter base. As such Joseph R. Angelo was proclaimed the "Mayor of East Summit" and citizens sued the municipal government. The lawsuit to split the city in half, Mosely v. Kates, got as far as the Supreme Court of New Jersey which ultimately ruled in favor of the defendants and the city was kept whole.

In the late 1970s, Summit had a mini-bus system, with three long circular routes through most parts of Summit that were primarily designed to bring commuters to the railroad station downtown. The Velvet Underground played their first paid concert at a Summit High School prom.

21st century
More than a dozen Summit residents died in the September 11 terrorist attacks. Many worked in the World Trade Center, and commuted by rail to Hoboken. A few days after the attacks, townspeople assembled on the town green while a minister "called out the names of a dozen residents still unaccounted for after Tuesday's attack on the World Trade Center. Others in the crowd of nearly 2,000 called out names he had left out." A few World Trade Center firms moved to Summit.

Summit has consistently ranked high in NJMonthly's biennial Top 100 Towns. In 2019, Summit was ranked the second best place to live.

In 2005, star baseball athlete Willie Wilson and former Summit graduate returned to Summit High School. Wilson said: "To me, Summit is a special place ... It's where it all began and I have great memories. This is where I want to help kids and youth baseball, and I want my own son and daughter to come and help me create something here." During the economic downturn of 2008–2009, Summit was listed as #6 on a list of American communities "likely to be pummeled by the economic crisis." Crime is generally not bad in the city; the summer 2010 assault of Abelino Mazariego-Torres during a robbery attempt gone awry shocked residents in what one person described as a "very small and very peaceful town." Several youths were charged in the murder.

Geography

According to the United States Census Bureau, the city had a total area of 6.05 square miles (15.66 km2), including 5.99 square miles (15.52 km2) of land and 0.05 square miles (0.13 km2) of water (0.84%).

Springfield Avenue is the city's main street.

Unincorporated communities, localities and place names located partially or completely within the city include Brantwood Park and Tall Oaks.

It is bordered to the northeast by Millburn in Essex County, to the northwest by Chatham and Chatham Township, both in Morris County, to the west by New Providence, to the southwest by Berkeley Heights, to the south by Mountainside and to the southeast by Springfield Township.

Demographics

The city has long been popular with traders, investment bankers, and money managers, with nearly 20% of Summit's residents working in finance and real estate. One report said that Manhattan's financial elite prefers living in Summit because of large houses, great schools, and NJ Transit's rail link to Manhattan's financial district.

2010 census

The Census Bureau's 2006–2010 American Community Survey showed that (in 2010 inflation-adjusted dollars) median household income was $109,602 and the median family income was $145,083. Males had a median income of $109,608 (+/− $15,245) versus $61,368 (+/− $8,854) for females. The per capita income for the city was $70,574. About 4.4% of families and 6.5% of the population were below the poverty line, including 7.4% of those under age 18 and 5.9% of those age 65 or over.

2000 census
At the 2000 United States census there were 21,131 people, 7,897 households and 5,606 families residing in the city. The population density was 3,490.7 per square mile (1,348.5/km2). There were 8,146 housing units at an average density of 1,345.7 per square mile (519.9/km2). The racial makeup of the city was 87.77% White, 4.33% African American, 0.09% Native American, 4.45% Asian, 0.01% Pacific Islander, 1.70% from other races, and 1.65% from two or more races. Hispanic or Latino of any race were 10.17% of the population.

There were 7,897 households, of which 35.7% had children under the age of 18 living with them, 61.1% were married couples living together, 7.8% had a female householder with no husband present, and 29.0% were non-families. 23.9% of all households were made up of individuals, and 10.2% had someone living alone who was 65 years of age or older. The average household size was 2.67 and the average family size was 3.18.

Age distribution was 27.0% under the age of 18, 4.4% from 18 to 24, 33.0% from 25 to 44, 22.5% from 45 to 64, and 13.1% who were 65 years of age or older. The median age was 37 years. For every 100 females, there were 93.8 males. For every 100 females age 18 and over, there were 89.1 males.

The median income for a household in the city was $92,964, and the median income for a family was $117,053. Males had a median income of $85,625 versus $46,811 for females. The per capita income for the city was $62,598. About 2.5% of families and 4.2% of the population were below the poverty line, including 4.1% of those under age 18 and 4.3% of those age 65 or over.

Economy

Corporate residents of Summit include:
 Celgene is a biotechnology company and the largest corporate tax-payer in Summit. Its facilities in the eastern part of Summit underwent recent expansion. It recently purchased a campus on the western part of Summit, formerly owned by Merck & Co. (formerly Schering Plough pharmaceuticals until a 2009 merger) these facilities were previously home to Novartis and, before that, Ciba. 
 Overlook Medical Center is located on a hill with views of the Manhattan skyline and is operated by the Atlantic Health System and features the Atlantic Neuroscience Institute, the Carol G. Simon Cancer Center and the Gagnon Cardiovascular Institute.
 Whiptail Technologies is a maker of solid state storage appliances.
 Hibernia Atlantic is headquartered in Summit and is a transatlantic submarine cable network provider.

Arts and culture 

The Summit Opera House was built in the 1890s by the Woman's Christian Temperance Union as meeting place and dry entertainment hall. It currently houses Winberie's restaurant on the ground floor, and a church, office space, and apartments on the upper floors. It is located at Springfield Avenue and Kent Place Boulevard in downtown Summit.

The Summit Playhouse mounts live dramatic performances.

The Visual Arts Center of New Jersey, on Elm Street diagonally across from the Summit Middle School, is a professionally recognized regional art center with an art school and an exhibition program.

Horseback riding is available at the Watchung stables, located in the Watchung Reservation since the 1930s.

The city supports a program of public art organized by Summit Public Art, a volunteer-based city organization founded in 2002, whose mission is to bring art to public spaces throughout Summit. In 2019, the city was encouraging artists, including singer-songwriters, to perform at local venues in the downtown area, as part of its Summit Street Sounds program.

Parks and recreation

Summit Community Center
In 2019 the city finished the renovations of the expanded Summit Community Center. The renovated facility includes two gymnasiums, which allows indoor basketball for youth, a senior citizens lounge, a meeting room, administrative offices, a game room, and a small kitchen. There are two parking lots.

Local parks and reserves

Reeves-Reed Arboretum is a suburban conservancy dedicated to environmental and horticultural education for children and adults and enjoyment of nature through the professional care and preservation of a historic country estate.
It is bordered along its western side by Park Drive, along the east by Shunpike Road, and on the northern side by Briant Parkway and Morris Avenue. A brook cuts through the park, and the park is connected via a greenway to Hidden Valley Park in the southeast. There is a pond for ice-skating and fishing, some picnic areas, athletic fields, and a fitness trail."
"Hidden Valley Park,  owned by Union County, New Jersey and located in the City of Summit and Springfield Township. The park contains  of basically undeveloped land that is connected via a greenway along Orchard Street to Briant Park. Hidden Valley Park is bordered along its southern edge by Interstate 78 and along the west by the residential neighborhoods along Baltusrol Road and Morris Avenue."  Its eastern border is adjacent to the now-closed Houdaille Quarry which is now parkland owned by the county.
Passaic River Parkway, owned by Union County, New Jersey, is actually six small park areas along the Passaic River in western Union County (Summit, New Providence, Berkeley Heights). Area #1 in Summit and New Providence is located between Route 124 and the railroad tracks. The northern area of the park bordered by Morris County, and the southern area is bordered by River Road in Summit."
Watchung Reservation is a  nature reserve and recreation area administered by the Union County Parks Department that is bounded by Summit, Mountainside, Berkeley Heights, Scotch Plains and Springfield Township. The reservation consists mainly of the upper valley of Blue Brook, between the ridges of First Watchung Mountain and Second Watchung Mountain. A dam near the headwaters of the creek creates Lake Surprise.

Planned rail trail
 
As of 2022, construction is underway on the Summit Park Line, a  pedestrian linear park that will run from Morris Avenue by the Overlook Medical Center to Briant Park, mostly along a segment of the abandoned Rahway Valley Railroad (RVRR). The park will connect the central business district, another public park, walkways, and nature areas while offering a view of the Manhattan skyline. Approved in December 2020, the park's creation is fully funded by foundation grants and individual and corporate donations. Its creation is guided by the non-profit Summit Park Line Foundation. A footbridge over Morris Avenue in Summit was installed in October 2022.

Beyond its Summit portion, area residents have pushed for the full abandoned RVRR Main Line to become a rail trail. Doing so would create a 7.3-mile pedestrian linear park along the RVRR main line from Summit to the southwest edge of Roselle Park and provide a protected greenway to connect several county parks akin to the High Line.   The rail trail would run eastbound from the Overlook Medical Center on the edge of downtown Summit as the Summit Park Line and then head south along the old railbed through Springfield, Union, and Kenilworth and ending at the southwest edge of Roselle Park at the Cranford border.

In 2022, as the Summit Park Line proceeds, advocates have also been pushing for immediate development of the RVRR Main Line portion south of Route 22, running southbound past the Galloping Hill Golf Course through Kenilworth and Roselle Park. The New Jersey Department of Transportation, which owns the railbed, has been working to clear its southern end for possible use as a trail.   Were the rail trail to expand even farther, beyond the 7.3 mile RVRR Main Line railbed, it could conceivably connect in the Cranford area with the unused Staten Island Rapid Transit line, eventually connecting to a bridge over the Arthur Kill in Linden.

Government

Local government

Summit operates under the city form of municipal government; one of 15 (of the 564) municipalities statewide that use this form. On April 11, 1899, Summit voters adopted as the Charter of the City of Summit the Statute of 1899 applicable to cities of less than 12,000 population. On December 15, 1987, the New Jersey Legislature enacted a law that repealed the original charter, retaining those sections not covered by general law that were specific to Summit. The charter now specifies that "1: The council may, by referendum, change the term of the councilman at large from a two year term to a four year term. 2: Resolutions adopted by the council do not have to be approved by the mayor. 3: The council pro tempore shall be the acting mayor in the mayor's absence due to sickness or other cause. 4: The municipality may appoint an administrator in accordance with the provisions of N.J.S. 40A:9-136. 5: The municipality may adopt an administrative code."

The mayor is elected by the city for a four-year term and is the city's official spokesman and chief elected official. The mayor can appoint various officials, including the chief of police and the board of education. The mayor serves as the chairman of the Board of School Estimate and on various committees, and has the right to speak at common council meetings, but can only vote to break ties in the council. This bully pulpit role is considered the mayor's strongest power.

The common council has the chief policy making and administrative oversight role in city government. The council approves all laws and adopts the city budget. The council also oversees the work of city department heads. The council is comprised of three members from Ward I and three members from Ward II plus one member elected at-large. The at-large member serves a two-year term of office, while the six ward members serve three-year terms on a staggered basis, with one seat in each ward up for election each year. The council elects from its membership a president and a president pro tem, each serving a one-year term. The president presides at all council meetings, and the president pro tem presides in the president's absence. The president pro tem also serves as acting mayor in the absence of the mayor.

, the mayor of Summit is Democrat Nora G. Radest, whose term of office ends December 31, 2023. Members of the common council are Council President Greg S. Vartan III (D, 2024; Second Ward), President Pro Tempore Susan D. Hairston (D, 2023; First Ward), Lisa K. Allen (R, 2025; Second Ward), Marjorie Fox (D, 2023; Second Ward), Jaime Levine (D, 2023; At Large), Andy Minegar (D, 2024; First Ward) and Delia Hamlet (R, 2025; First Ward).

In February 2021, the common council selected Lisa K. Allen from a list of three candidates nominated by the Republican municipal committee to fill the Second Ward seat expiring in December 2022 that had been held by Stephen Bowman until he resigned from office. Allen served on an interim basis until the November 2021 general election, when she was elected to serve the balance of the term of office.

Summit had been a stronghold of the Republican Party for years. From 1921 to 2001, no Democrats served in elected office and very few ran for office. The real elections occurred in the Republican primary. In 2001, two Democratic candidates were elected to council: Michel Bitritto won in Ward I and Jordan Glatt won the at-large seat. Summit had never elected a Democrat as mayor until 2003, when Jordan Glatt was elected.

In November 2011, Republicans swept all the open seats, with Ellen Dickson elected mayor and Gregory Drummond, Patrick Hurley and Robert Rubino sweeping the three council seats, giving full control of city government back to the Republican party.

Democrats began making inroads in the ensuing years, with the election of Nora Radest, a Democrat, for mayor in 2015, along with two Democratic council members (David Naidu and Richard Sun, who was the youngest-ever elected city official at the age of 24). In November 2018, for the first time in Summit's history, Democrats were elected to hold the majority of seats on council.

In November 2019, Susan Hairston was sworn in to the First Ward seat expiring in December 2020 that became vacant following the death of Matthew Gould. In 2020, she was elected to the same seat, becoming the first African-American council member in city history.
 
Michael F. Rogers is the city administrator of Summit. In this role, he directs day-to-day operations of city government and the city departments.

The Department of Community Services is responsible for engineering, public works, and code administration. The engineering division manages city infrastructure such as roads, curbs, sewers, and provide support to the planning and zoning boards. Public works maintains streets, trees, traffic signs, public parks, traffic islands, playgrounds, public buildings, support vehicles, equipment, and has other responsibilities. The city runs a municipal disposal area / solid waste transfer station where recyclables are collected, including bulky trash; residents must have a town-generated sticker on their cars to use this facility. Certain trees require government permission in the form of a permit before being removed. Summit provides for snow plowing  of roads, covering all city streets, except for county roads. The city has embarked on a program of "Bringing Art to Public Spaces in Summit"; this program, established in 2002, has placed sculptures at different venues around the town and is supported in part by private donations. The Summit Chamber of Commerce advertises the town on cable television.

In 2018, the city had an average property tax bill of $17,919, the highest in the county, compared to an average bill of $8,767 statewide.

Federal, state and county representation
Summit is located in the 7th Congressional District and is part of New Jersey's 21st state legislative district.

 

Union County is governed by a Board of County Commissioners, whose nine members are elected at-large to three-year terms of office on a staggered basis with three seats coming up for election each year, with an appointed County Manager overseeing the day-to-day operations of the county. At an annual reorganization meeting held in the beginning of January, the board selects a Chair and Vice Chair from among its members. , Union County's County Commissioners are 
Chair Rebecca Williams (D, Plainfield, term as commissioner and as chair ends December 31, 2022), 
Vice Chair Christopher Hudak (D, Linden, term as commissioner ends 2023; term as vice chair ends 2022),
James E. Baker Jr. (D, Rahway, 2024),
Angela R. Garretson (D, Hillside, 2023),
Sergio Granados (D, Elizabeth, 2022),
Bette Jane Kowalski (D, Cranford, 2022), 
Lourdes M. Leon (D, Elizabeth, 2023),
Alexander Mirabella (D, Fanwood, 2024) and 
Kimberly Palmieri-Mouded (D, Westfield, 2024).
Constitutional officers elected on a countywide basis are
County Clerk Joanne Rajoppi (D, Union Township, 2025),
Sheriff Peter Corvelli (D, Kenilworth, 2023) and
Surrogate Susan Dinardo (acting).
The County Manager is Edward Oatman.

Politics
As of March 2021, there were a total of 16,171 registered voters in Summit, of which 6,048 (37.4% vs. 49.6% countywide) were registered as Democrats, 4,014 (24.8% vs. 15.8%) were registered as Republicans and 6,109 (37.7% vs. 34.5%) were registered as Unaffiliated. Among the city's 2020 Census population, 68.6% (vs. 58.9% in Union County) were registered to vote, including 94.9% of those ages 18 and over (vs. 77% countywide).

In the 2020 Presidential election, Democrat Joe Biden received 8,500 votes (67.2% vs. 62.8% countywide) ahead of Republican Donald Trump with 3,846 votes (30.4% vs. 35.5% countywide). In the 2016 presidential election, Democrat Hillary Clinton received 5,776 votes (60.3% vs. 65.9% countywide) ahead of Republican Donald Trump with 3,210 votes (33.5% vs.30.5% countywide) and other candidates with 421 votes (4.4% vs. 3.6% countywide). In the 2012 presidential election, Democrat Barack Obama received 4,895 votes (49.4% vs. 66.0% countywide), ahead of Republican Mitt Romney with 4,859 votes (49.1% vs. 32.3%) and other candidates with 109 votes (1.1% vs. 0.8%), among the 9,899 ballots cast by the city's 14,330 registered voters, for a turnout of 69.1% (vs. 68.8% in Union County). In the 2008 presidential election, Democrat Barack Obama received 5,820 votes (54.5% vs. 63.1% countywide), ahead of Republican John McCain with 4,700 votes (44.0% vs. 35.2%) and other candidates with 88 votes (0.8% vs. 0.9%), among the 10,677 ballots cast by the city's 13,690 registered voters, for a turnout of 78.0% (vs. 74.7% in Union County). In the 2004 presidential election, Republican George W. Bush received 5,183 votes (50.0% vs. 40.3% countywide), ahead of Democrat John Kerry with 5,068 votes (48.9% vs. 58.3%) and other candidates with 75 votes (0.7% vs. 0.7%), among the 10,360 ballots cast by the city's 13,159 registered voters, for a turnout of 78.7% (vs. 72.3% in the whole county).

In the 2017 gubernatorial election, Democrat Phil Murphy received 57.2% of the vote (3,495 votes) ahead of Republican Kim Guadagno with 41.2% (2,520 votes) and other candidates with 1.6% (99 votes) among the 6,114 total votes cast by the city's 15,131 registered voters for a turnout of 40.4%. In the 2013 gubernatorial election, Republican Chris Christie received 68.1% of the vote (3,971 cast), ahead of Democrat Barbara Buono with 30.6% (1,785 votes), and other candidates with 1.3% (76 votes), among the 5,928 ballots cast by the city's 14,076 registered voters (96 ballots were spoiled), for a turnout of 42.1%. In the 2009 gubernatorial election, Democrat Jon Corzine was defeated in his hometown when Republican Chris Christie received 3,682 votes (50.3% vs. 41.7% countywide), ahead his 3,014 votes (41.2% vs. 50.6%), Independent Chris Daggett with 543 votes (7.4% vs. 5.9%) and other candidates with 43 votes (0.6% vs. 0.8%), among the 7,323 ballots cast by the city's 13,435 registered voters, yielding a 54.5% turnout (vs. 46.5% in the county).

Education

Students in pre-kindergarten through twelfth grade are educated by the Summit Public Schools. As of the 2018–19 school year, the district, comprised of nine schools, had an enrollment of 3,961 students and 349.5 classroom teachers (on an FTE basis), for a student–teacher ratio of 11.3:1. Schools in the district (with 2018–19 enrollment data from the National Center for Education Statistics) are 
Jefferson Primary Center (128 students; in grades Pre-K–K), 
Wilson Primary Center (138; Pre-K–K), 
Brayton School (340; 1–5), 
Franklin School (336; 1–5), 
Jefferson School (227; 1–5), 
Lincoln-Hubbard School (314; 1–5), 
Washington School (346; 1–5), 
Lawton C. Johnson Summit Middle School (942; 6–8) and 
Summit High School (1,169; 9–12).

The district's board of education is comprised of seven members who set policy and oversee the fiscal and educational operation of the district through its administration. As a Type I school district, the board's trustees are appointed by the Mayor to serve three-year terms of office on a staggered basis, with either two or three members up for reappointment each year. Of the more than 600 school districts statewide, Summit is one of 15 districts with appointed school districts. The board appoints a superintendent to oversee the day-to-day operation of the district.

Private schools
 Kent Place School, founded in 1894, serves girls in preschool through 12th grade.
 Oak Knoll School of the Holy Child (K–6 coed; 7–12 for girls), which operates under the auspices of the Roman Catholic Archdiocese of Newark
 Oratory Preparatory School (7–12) was founded in 1907 as Carlton Academy
 St. Teresa of Avila School (K–8), operated by the Archdiocese of Newark
 HudsonWay Immersion School (NS–5), Mandarin Chinese and Spanish immersion program

Youth sports

Summit has sports programs for youth including basketball, baseball, soccer, and football leagues through the Recreation Center. In addition, the YMCA organizes sports clinics and teams including the Summit Area YMCA "Seals" Swim Team. At age eight, children can try out for a traveling soccer program called the Summit Soccer Club, a nonprofit dedicated to the development of youth soccer in the city. Travel soccer runs for both the fall and spring seasons.

Lacrosse is a popular sport with high school teams achieving distinction at state and national levels. Summit holds the third most NJSIAA Boys Group Titles. Since the Tournament of Champions (TOC) began in 2004, Summit has made the tournament 11 times. Summit has the fourth-most championship titles (2) and has finished runner-up four times. Prior to the new championship format, Summit was crowned champion twice with one runner-up finish.Summit High School boys' team won the state's Tournament of Champions in 2010 and 2009 and lost by one goal in the 2011 final. Summit holds the New Jersey state (and possibly national) high school record with 68 consecutive victories during 2009 to 2011. The 2012 team was ranked second in New Jersey in May 2012 and in the top 20 nationally. Beginning in first grade, boys and girls can learn to play lacrosse in clinics and teams organized by the Summit Lacrosse Club. Many Division 1 lacrosse players have come from Summit, either through Summit High School, or via private schools.

Real estate and housing

Summit residential real estate is among the most expensive in the state. The 2018 median home price was $987,583. Real estate taxes vary; an $800,000 four-bedroom, 2-full-bath, 2-partial-bath single-family home built in 1939 had taxes of $16,000 in 2009. As of 2018, the average property tax bill in the city of Summit was $17,930, the 14th highest in the state.

Summit, along with many suburban communities in the United States, adopted a policy of zoning ordinances requiring a single-family house on a large lot and could thereby "exclude any undesirable influences that might erode property values", a requirement that effectively excluded apartment buildings and multi-family dwellings, and tended to raise the price of houses. One study found that since 1945, the single-family house on a large lot zoning mechanism "has been increasingly used in suburban and rural areas to safeguard particular vested interests." A reporter from The New York Times who is a Summit resident criticized the city for being an "economically, racially and ideologically homogenized populace" with "a growing divide between Summit's haves and have-nots." He elaborated in 2006: "there's an ever-diminishing corner of the city akin to the so-called slums of Beverly Hills, where middle-income homeowners like me can take advantage of the schools and services of Summit without the million-dollar price tags so ubiquitous on the other side of the Midtown Direct tracks." But he preferred the city as a place to raise and educate his children. One developer sued the city in 2005 to comply with New Jersey's Fair Housing Act to provide more affordable housing units. The city is working on a "housing master plan" to avoid future lawsuits from developers. In 2011, volunteers with Habitat for Humanity, in conjunction with church groups including St. Teresa of Avila and the Unitarian Church led by Vanessa Southern, constructed affordable housing on Morris Avenue.

Union County, which includes Summit, had the 10th highest property taxes in the nation as of 2010, based on data gathered by the National Taxpayers Union.

Landmarks

 The Summit Downtown Historic District is on the United States Department of Interior National Register of Historic Places.
 The Carter House – at 90 Butler Parkway, Summit's oldest known structure, built in 1741, now home to the Summit Historical Society.
 The DeBary Inn was built in 1880 as one of the private residences of (Samuel) Frederick De Bary, a merchant of French wines, liquors, and other imported beverages. In 1916, the land was subdivided and sold, the house was moved , and it opened as a hotel in 1923; later it housed senior citizens. Authorities and rules stymied an effort to turn it into a bed and breakfast in the early 2000s, and at present it serves as an "executive boutique inn" partially owned by CNBC host Jim Cramer.
 Vanderpoel Castle was a large residence built by George Vanderpoel in 1885. It was located on a 15-acre estate adjacent to Vanderpoel pond on what is now the Summit Municipal Golf Course, near the intersection of River Road, Route 24 and JFK Parkway. Later divided into apartments, it was demolished in 1969.
 The Grand Summit Hotel (formerly The Summit Suburban Hotel) hosts a variety of events, including stockholder meetings.
 The Kent Place School occupies a large block bordered by Kent Place Boulevard, Norwood Avenue, and Morris Avenue near downtown Summit. Its Mabie House was built in 1931.
 Dominican Monastery of Our Lady of the Rosary monastery is located on Springfield Avenue.
 The Summit Diner, located on the corner of Union Place & Summit Avenue, is a 1938 O'Mahony diner that has wood paneled walls, eight booths and 20 stools. It is said to be the oldest operating diner in the state.
Summit Free Public Library offers a wide range of books, CDs, DVDs, internet access, special programs, and is located at the corner of Maple Street and Morris Avenue.
 Twin Maples is a registered Historic Place at Springfield Avenue and Edgewood Road. Constructed in 1908 based on a design by architect Alfred F. Norris, it is home to the Summit Fortnightly Club and the Junior Fortnightly.
 The United States Postal Service is on Maple Street near the downtown.

Transportation

Roads and highways

Route 24 and Route 124 run along the eastern boundary of Summit, and Interstate 78 runs along the southern boundary. County Routes 512, 527 and 649 also pass through the city.

Parking is an ongoing issue. There are several free two-hour-limit parking lots for shoppers, as well as metered parking on main streets. The city council has conducted studies to explore further parking options.

Public transportation

NJ Transit's Morristown Line and Gladstone Branch merge at Summit station, providing frequent passenger service to New York's Penn Station and Hoboken Terminal. The  train ride from Summit to New York is about 50 minutes (local) or 35 minutes (express). One reporter wrote: "The train line dominates Summit, bisecting its handsome commercial district from the town green on a sunken track, like a Dutch canal."

NJ Transit offers bus service to and from Newark on the 70 route with local Wheels service on the 986 route.

Lakeland Bus Lines (Route 78) provides direct service to and from Manhattan during peak commuting hours.

Newark Liberty International Airport in Newark / Elizabeth is about 15 minutes away via Interstate 78.

Media
Daily newspapers serving the community are The New York Times, The Wall Street Journal, and The Star-Ledger.

Locally, Summit is served by the Summit Herald-Dispatch and the Independent Press, the latter of which is based in New Providence and serves the City of Summit and several surrounding communities.  Both newspapers are published on a weekly basis. Summit is also served by the online news source, The Alternative Press

Summit is home to HomeTowne Television (HTTV), a cable television station providing public, educational, and government access (PEG) cable TV programming. HTTV's signal reaches municipalities in Union, Essex and Morris counties via Verizon channel 33 and Comcast channel 36. The station produces original content weekly and provides live streaming from hometownetv.org. The station is run by station manager, Amanda Olsen.

In popular culture
In "Mr. Monk and the End", the series finale of the cable TV show Monk, the fictional character of Randy Disher reveals he is leaving San Francisco because he has been offered the job as the chief of police of Summit, New Jersey. He is also going there to marry his longtime crush, Sharona Fleming. Following this up, in the 2012 novel Mr. Monk on Patrol, Randy has to bring Monk in after a corruption scandal sweeps the Summit government, leading to Randy becoming acting mayor.

Notable people

People who were born in, residents of, or otherwise closely associated with Summit include:

 Ozzie Ahlers (born 1946), songwriter and music producer who plays the keyboard, guitar, and bass who has played with Van Morrison, Jerry Garcia, The Edge and Craig Chaquico, in addition to a solo career
 Robert Arellano (born 1969), author, musician and educator
 Miles Austin (born 1984), former wide receiver for the Dallas Cowboys, Cleveland Browns, and Philadelphia Eagles
 Stephen Austin, former NFL executive
 Michael Badgley (born 1995), football placekicker for the Detroit Lions of the National Football League
 Paul Baier (born 1985), professional ice hockey player
 Sean Baker (born 1978), filmmaker best known for the independent feature films Starlet, Tangerine and The Florida Project
 John Bardeen (1908–1991), only person to have won two (shared) Nobel prizes in physics, in 1956 for the transistor and in 1972 for superconductivity
 Wendy Barker (born 1942), poet
 Anthony James Barr (born 1940), programming language designer, software engineer and inventor
 Jack Belden (1910–1989), war correspondent who covered the Japanese invasion of China, the Second World War and the Chinese Revolution
 James M. Bennett (born 1948), FairTax advocate
 Mark Berson (born 1953), men's soccer coach at the University of South Carolina
 Robert Blackburn (1920–2003), artist and print maker
 Brett Ellen Block (born 1973), short story author and novelist
 Walter Houser Brattain (1902–1987), physicist who shared the 1956 Nobel Prize in Physics for the transistor
 Arthur Raymond Brooks (1895–1991), last surviving American flying ace of World War I
 Dave Brown (born 1970), quarterback who played for the New York Giants
 Fritz Buehning (born 1960), former professional tennis player
 Levin H. Campbell (born 1927), judge on the United States Court of Appeals for the First Circuit
 John Carroll (born 1955), basketball coach who served as the head coach for the Boston Celtics during the latter part of the 2003–2004 season
 Mark Cesark (born 1965), sculptor, best known for his use of found and scrap steel
 Greg Cohen (born 1953), jazz artist
 Laurie Collyer (born 1967), film director, best known for Sherrybaby
 Anthony Comstock (1844–1915), legal reformer, famous for the anti-pornography laws named after him
 William A. Conway (1910–2006), banking executive and activist shareholder of behalf of minority stockholders
 Jon Corzine (born 1947), former U.S. Senator from New Jersey and former Governor of New Jersey
 Marguerite Courtot (1897–1986), silent film actress
 Jim Cramer (born 1955), stock trader, and anchor of CNBC's former Kudlow & Cramer and present Mad Money
 Marshall Curry (born ), two-time Academy Award-nominated American documentary director, producer, cinematographer and editor of such films as Street Fight about the 2002 Newark mayoral election
 Paul Davenport (born 1946), ninth president of the University of Western Ontario
 Benjamin Henry Day Jr. (1838–1916), illustrator and printer, best known for his invention of Ben-Day dots
 (Samuel) Frederick De Bary (1815–1898), wealthy businessman who gave his name to Summit's DeBary Inn and to DeBary, Florida
 Leonard De Paur (1914–1998), composer
 Mark Di Ionno (born 1956), journalist and writer
 Lawrence Dillon (born 1959), composer who is Composer in Residence at the University of North Carolina School of the Arts
 Daniel Doan (1914–1993), author best known for his works about hiking in New England
 Mark Donohue (1937–1975), race car, Indy, Formula 1 and NASCAR driver who was the winner of the 1972 Indy 500
 David Drake, chef
 East River Pipe, musician Fred M. Cornog
 Frankie Edgar (born 1981), mixed martial artist who is the current UFC lightweight champion
 Brian Edwards (born 1984), goalkeeper for Toronto FC
 Alan Louis Eggers (1895–1968), received the Medal of Honor for his actions during World War I
 Marianne Espinosa, Judge of the Appellate Division of New Jersey Superior Court
 Maggie Estep (1963–2014), writer and poet most well known for coming to prominence during the height of the spoken word and poetry slam performance rage
 Kevin C. Fitzpatrick (born 1966), author who has written about Dorothy Parker
 Bob Franks (1951–2010), politician who served in the New Jersey General Assembly and represented New Jersey's 7th congressional district
 Kristine Froseth (born 1996), actress and model, known for playing Kelly Aldrich in the Netflix series The Society and Alaska Young in the Hulu series Looking for Alaska.
 Doug Gansler (born 1962), attorney and politician who served as 45th Attorney General of Maryland
 Lauren Beth Gash (born 1960), lawyer and politician who served in the Illinois House of Representatives from 1993 to 2001
 Alex Gibney (born 1953), documentary film director and producer
 Charles Gibson (born 1943), former anchor of ABC News' World News Tonight and Good Morning America
 Dave Given (born 1954), former ice hockey right winger who played one game in the World Hockey Association for the Vancouver Blazers
 Scott Goldblatt (born 1979), freestyle swimmer who won a gold medal at the 2004 Summer Olympics
 Joseph Greenspan (born 1992), soccer player for the Pittsburgh Riverhounds SC of the United Soccer League
 Edna Guy (1907–1982), modern dance pioneer
 Alina Habba (born 1984), lawyer best known for representing former President of the United States, Donald Trump.
 Norman Hill (born 1933), civil rights activist
 Constance Horner (born 1942), public official in the Reagan and first Bush administrations
 Frederick Erastus Humphreys (1883–1941), one of the first military pilots trained by the Wright brothers
 Ice-T (born 1958 as Tracy Lauren Marrow), rapper / actor who lived in Summit and attended Brayton Elementary School and Summit Junior High School (now Lawton C. Johnson Summit Middle School), both part of Summit Public Schools
 Charles R. Jackson (1903–1968), novelist best known for The Lost Weekend
 Nikki M. James (born 1981), actress and singer
 Violet A. Johnson (1870-1939), civic leader and founder of Fountain Baptist Church
 Reggie Jones (born 1951), retired boxer who represented the U.S. at the 1972 Summer Olympics, where he was controversially eliminated in a fight he was generally accepted to have won
 Susan Kenney (born 1941), short story writer and novelist
 Lord Chancellor Kent (1763–1847), Lord Chancellor of New York State (1814–1823)
 Raymond Kethledge (born 1966), judge on the United States Court of Appeals for the Sixth Circuit
 Peter Kuhn (1955–2009), race car driver who won both the USAC and SCCA Formula Super Vee championships in 1980
 Peter Kuper (born 1958), alternative cartoonist and illustrator
 William "Bill" Larned (1872–1926), professional tennis player who won the U.S. Open seven times from 1901 through 1911
 Al Leiter (born 1965), former MLB pitcher who played for both the New York Mets and New York Yankees
 Jack Leiter (born 2000), son of Al Leiter and potential first-round pick in the 2021 MLB Draft
 MJ Long (1939–2018), architect, lecturer and author, best known for her work as a principal architect partner on the British Library in London, together with her husband
 William Lowell Sr. (1863-1954), dentist and an inventor of a wooden golf tee patented in 1921
 Hamilton Wright Mabie (1846–1916), author, lived in Summit
 Holbrook Mann MacNeille (1907–1973), mathematician who led military research teams before directing the American Mathematical Society
 Tim Mahoney (born 1956), former U.S. Representative from Florida's 16th congressional district
 Eli Manning (born 1981), Former New York Giants quarterback
 Olivia Miles (born 2003), college basketball player for the Notre Dame Fighting Irish women's basketball team.
 Bryce Miller (born 1982), race car driver in the WeatherTech SportsCar Championship
 Richard McGee Morse (1922–2001), scholar of Latin American studies
 Eric Munoz (1947–2009), member of the New Jersey General Assembly who died in office
 Nancy Munoz (born 1954), member of the New Jersey General Assembly who took office following her husband's death
 Heidi Neumark (born 1954), pastor and spiritual writer
 Alexa Noel (born 2002), professional tennis player
 Ryan O'Malley (born 1993), tight end with the Oakland Raiders of the NFL
 Thomas E. O'Shea (1895–1918), United States Army corporal awarded the Medal of Honor posthumously for his actions during World War I
 Margareta Pâslaru (born 1943), Romanian singer
 Stephen Paulus (1949–2014), composer
 Hugo Pfaltz (1931–2019), politician who served two terms in the New Jersey General Assembly
 Christopher Porrino (born 1967), lawyer who became New Jersey Attorney General in 2016
 Jeff Porter (born 1985), track and field athlete who competes in the 110-meter hurdles and was named as part of the U.S. team at the 2016 Summer Olympics
 Joe Porter (born 1985), professional football player
 Monroe Jackson Rathbone II (1900–1976), chemical engineer and businessman who was the chairman, president, and CEO of Standard Oil of New Jersey
 Dennis Ritchie (1941–2011), creator of the C programming language and co-inventor of the UNIX operating system
 Florence Spearing Randolph (1866-1951), suffragist, ordained minister, pastor of the Wallace Chapel AME Zion Church
 Bill Robinson (born 1929), jazz singer
 David D. Rudolph (born 1949), member of the Maryland House of Delegates
 George Erik Rupp (born 1942), former President of Rice University and Columbia University, who has headed the International Rescue Committee since 2002
 Rex Ryan (born 1962), head coach of the Buffalo Bills
 Eli Sagan (1927–2015), clothing manufacturer, author, George McGovern campaign staffer, and member of Richard Nixon's Enemies List
 C. Thomas Schettino (1907–1983), Associate Justice of the New Jersey Supreme Court from 1959 to 1972
 Craig Schiffer (born 1956), former Chief Executive Officer of the Americas of Dresdner Kleinwort
 Herb Schmidt, soccer and lacrosse coach at Penn State University
 Pat Shurmur (born 1965), former head coach of the New York Giants
 James Sie (born 1962), voice actor
 Gaddis Smith (1932–2022), historian at Yale University and an expert on U.S. foreign relations and maritime history
 Scott Smith (born 1965), author of the novel A Simple Plan and the script of the film of the same name
 Janet Sorg Stoltzfus, (1931–2004), educator, who established the Ta'iz Cooperative School, the first non-religious school in north Yemen.
 Joseph Stamler (1911–1988), New Jersey Superior Court judge and professor at Rutgers University
 Meryl Streep (born 1949), actress, winner of three Academy Awards, 21-time Oscar nominee
 Sándor Szabó (born 1960), pianist
 Will Taggart (born ), guitarist
 Tom Terrell (1950–2007), music journalist
 Henry Twombly (1862–1955), college football player and lawyer
 James Valenti (born 1977), operatic tenor
 Edwin S. Votey (1856-1931), businessman, inventor, industrial designer, and manufacturer of pianos and organs
 Arthur K. Watson (1919–1974), IBM executive and United States Ambassador to France
 Gerard Way (born 1977), singer-songwriter, who is co-founder of the band My Chemical Romance
 Kai Wehmeier (born 1968), logician and philosopher at the University of California, Irvine
 Meredith Whitney (born 1969), award-winning stock analyst who predicted the 2007–2008 banking crisis
 Worthington Whittredge (1820–1910), landscape artist and important member of the Hudson River School
 Robert R. Williams (1886–1965), chemist who was the first to synthesize thiamine
 Willie Wilson (born 1955), retired professional baseball player who won the American League batting title and who was a two-time All-Star for the Kansas City Royals
 Nick Wyman (born 1950), actor and president of Actors' Equity Association
 Adam Zucker (born 1976), sportscaster for CBS Sports and CBS Sports Network

Points of interest
 Watchung Reservation, a nature reserve, borders Summit to the south.
 Downtown Summit has a variety of restaurants of different cuisines.
 Memorial Field features athletic fields, a play area for children, and tennis and basketball courts.
 Canoe Brook Country Club
 Beacon Hill Club
 New Jersey Visual Arts Center
 Summit Free Public Library
 Summit Family Aquatic Center
 Summit Community Center
 Summit Area YMCA

Non-profit and charitable organizations 

 Other Fellow First Foundation. Headquartered at the Summit Diner since its founding in 2000, the Other Fellow First Foundation uses its small endowment to quickly aid New Jersey families in distress. It has raised and given away more than $6,000,000 to people and local non-profit organizations. They run a yearly "Frozen Turkey Drive" and have raised money for SAGE Eldercare's Meals on Wheels program, the Summit Volunteer First Aid Squad's new building, and other causes.
GRACE. Founded in 2016 by the Junior League of Summit with The Connection and The United Way, GRACE (Giving and Receiving Assistance for our Community's Essentials) give food and basic necessities to local families in need. Until 2020, the all-volunteer program supported the weekly needs of about 100 local families; the pandemic pushed that number to more than 500. In 2020, GRACE achieved 501c(3) status and became a part of the City's Department of Community Programs. GRACE is headquartered at Cornog Field House at Soldier's Memorial Field in Summit.
Bridges Outreach. Founded in 1988, Bridges Outreach in 2020 delivered 65,000 brown bag meals, 10,000 pairs of underwear and socks, 7,500 toiletry kits, 49,000 cups of soup, and other clothing to more than 21,000 people in New York City, Newark, Irvington, and Summit.
SHIP (Summit Helping Its People). Founded in 1990 by the Summit Interfaith Clergy Fellowship and supported solely by donations, SHIP serves more than 15,000 lunch and dinner meals each year to homeless and at-risk homeless people not served by other local programs.
Summit Marches On. Founded in 2017 to advocate for progressive causes, voter education/engagement, and to organize local events and initiatives to support the community. Their charitable initiatives include: SHIELD of Summit, which matches senior citizens and the infirm with volunteer grocery shoppers; the Fabric Mask Assembly line; the Summit Volunteer Hub on Facebook, which matches charities and volunteers; and collaborations with a variety of local organizations on fundraising and good-raising initiatives.
Empowering Kids Organization. Founded in 2019, the group works to help underprivileged kids by connecting their families with opportunities and resources, such as tutoring, camps, and art and improv classes.
Family Promise. Founded in 1986 as a local charity, the organization now has affiliates nationwide. It works to help homeless and low-income families achieve independence through community efforts.

References

External links

 Official City of Summit Website
 Suburban Chamber of Commerce (includes Summit)
 Summit Historical Society

 
1869 establishments in New Jersey
Cities in Union County, New Jersey
City form of New Jersey government
Populated places established in 1869